Rondell Bernard White (born February 23, 1972) is an American former professional baseball player. He played in Major League Baseball as an outfielder and designated hitter. As well as being a solid defensive player, White also had a batting average of .300 or higher for four consecutive seasons from 1998 to 2001.

Pre-Major League Baseball career
White is a 1990 graduate of Jones County High School in Gray, Georgia, where he played baseball and basketball. He was the Atlanta Journal-Constitution's Player of the Year in 1990 and was also selected to the USA Today and Collegiate Baseball All-America squads that year.

Professional baseball career
White was drafted by the Montreal Expos as the 24th overall pick in the first round of 1990 Major League Baseball draft as a compensation pick from the California Angels for signing Mark Langston. White played in the Expos' minor league system for four years from 1990 to 1994. In 1993, White posted an impressive .380 batting average in 42 games for the Ottawa Lynx of the International League, earning him a promotion to the Expos. He made his major league debut on September 1, 1993 at the age of 21.

On June 11, 1995, White had the best game of his career when he hit for the cycle and had 6 hits in 7 at bats during a thirteen-inning game against the San Francisco Giants. He became the fourth Expos player in team history to hit for the cycle (preceded by Tim Foli on April 22, 1976, Chris Speier on July 20, 1978, and Tim Raines on August 16, 1987). He had two singles, two doubles, an extra-inning triple, and a home run.

In 1997, White hit a career-high 28 home runs for the Expos. He also led the National League center fielders with 379 putouts and 3 double plays and finished the 1997 season ranked second in the league with a 2.7 Defensive Wins Above Replacement (WAR). On July 31, 2000, the Expos traded White to the Chicago Cubs for Scott Downs.

After playing two seasons for the Cubs, he signed a two-year deal with the New York Yankees on December 17, 2001. On March 19, 2003 he was traded from the Yankees to the San Diego Padres for Bubba Trammell and Mark Phillips. That year he was named as a reserve player for the National League team in the 2003 All-Star Game. On August 26, 2003 he was traded to the Kansas City Royals for Chris Tierney and Brian Sanches. He ended the 2003 season with a career-high 87 runs batted in between the two teams. After the season, he became a free agent and signed with the Detroit Tigers. After two seasons with the Tigers, he signed with the Minnesota Twins on December 22, 2005. White played in his final major league game on September 30, 2007 at the age of 35.

Career statistics
In a fifteen-year major league career, White played in 1,474 games, accumulating 1,519 hits in 5,357 at bats for a .284 career batting average along with 198 home runs, 768 runs batted in and an on-base percentage of .336. He led the league in putouts in 1997, twice led the league in fielding percentage as an outfielder and retired with a .989 fielding percentage as a center fielder and a .985 fielding percentage as a left fielder, and overall with a .987 fielding percentage.

On December 13, 2007, White was mentioned in the Mitchell Report in connection to steroids.

See also

 List of Major League Baseball players to hit for the cycle
 List of Major League Baseball single-game hits leaders
 List of Major League Baseball players named in the Mitchell Report

References

External links
 

1972 births
Living people
African-American baseball players
American expatriate baseball players in Canada
Baseball players from Georgia (U.S. state)
Chicago Cubs players
Detroit Tigers players
Fort Myers Miracle players
Gulf Coast Expos players
Gulf Coast Twins players
Harrisburg Senators players
Kansas City Royals players
Major League Baseball center fielders
Major League Baseball designated hitters
Major League Baseball left fielders
Minnesota Twins players
Montreal Expos players
National League All-Stars
New York Yankees players
Ottawa Lynx players
People from Gray, Georgia
People from Milledgeville, Georgia
Rochester Red Wings players
San Diego Padres players
Sumter Flyers players
West Palm Beach Expos players
West Tennessee Diamond Jaxx players
21st-century African-American sportspeople
20th-century African-American sportspeople